Dositheus II Notaras of Jerusalem (Arachova 31 May 1641 – Constantinople 8 February 1707) was the Greek Orthodox Patriarch of Jerusalem between 1669 and 1707 and a theologian of the Eastern Orthodox Church. He was known for standing against influences of the Roman Catholic and Protestant Churches. He convened the Synod of Jerusalem to counter the Calvinist confessions of Cyril Lucaris.

Dositheus was born in Arachova (today the village of Exochi, Achaea) on 31 May 1641. Little of his early life is known. He was ordained a deacon in 1652 and elevated to archdeacon of Jerusalem in 1661. In 1666, he was consecrated archbishop of Caesarea Palestinae (now Caesarea, Israel). In 1669, he was elected patriarch of Jerusalem.

He became very involved in the state of the Orthodox Church in the Balkans, Georgia, and southern Russia, particularly after Patriarch Cyril Lucaris of Constantinople set forth in his Confession of Faith (1629) his agreement in the doctrines of predestination and justification by faith alone. In 1672, Patriarch Dositheus convened the Synod of Jerusalem that rejected all the Calvinist doctrines and reformulated Orthodox teachings in a manner that distinguished them from Roman Catholicism as well as Protestantism.

In correspondence with Peter I of Russia, he objected to Peter's reforms that subjected the Church to the state, particularly with his abolition of the Patriarchate of Moscow. Dositheus failed in his attempt to get Peter to intercede for the Eastern Orthodox Church in the peace treaty with the Ottoman Empire in 1700.

Dositheus died in Constantinople on 8 February 1707. In 1715, his twelve-volume History of the Patriarchate of Jerusalem was published.

External links
Dositheos (patriarch of Jerusalem) (Encyclopædia Britannica)
 

1641 births
1707 deaths
17th-century Greek Orthodox Patriarchs of Jerusalem
17th-century Greek clergy
Eastern Orthodox Christians from Greece
Eastern Orthodox theologians
People from Achaea
17th-century Greek writers
17th-century Greek educators
18th-century Greek writers
18th-century Greek educators